In historical linguistics, a macrofamily, also called a superfamily or phylum, is a proposed genetic relationship grouping together language families (also isolates) in a larger scale classification. However, Campbell regards this term as superfluous, preferring "language family" for those classifications for which there is consensus and "distant genetic relationship" for those for which there is no, or not yet, consensus, whether due to lack of documentation or scholarship of the constituent languages, or to an estimated time depth thought by many linguists to be too great for reconstruction.

More rarely, the term has also been applied to an exceptionally old, large and diverse language family, such as Afro-Asiatic.

Examples of proposed macro-families range from relatively recent such as East Asian, Macro-Jê, Macro-Waikurúan, Macro-Mayan, Macro-Siouan, Penutian, Na-Dene and Congo-Saharan (Niger-Saharan) to older ones such as Austric, Dené–Caucasian, Eurasiatic, Nostratic or Ural-Altaic.

See also
Language family
List of language families
Father Tongue hypothesis
Classification of Southeast Asian languages
Classification of indigenous languages of the Americas
Borean languages

References

Historical linguistics
Paleolinguistics
Proposed language families